The Pampas pipit (Anthus chacoensis), also known as the Chaco pipit or Campo pipit, is a species of bird in the family Motacillidae. It is found in Argentina and Paraguay. Its natural habitat is temperate grassland.

References

Pampas pipit
Birds of Argentina
Birds of the Pampas
Birds of Paraguay
Pampas pipit
Pampas pipit
Taxonomy articles created by Polbot